The Luxembourg national cricket team is the team that represents Luxembourg in international cricket. The Luxembourg Cricket Federation became an affiliate member of the International Cricket Council (ICC) in 1998 and an associate member in 2017.

Ground
Luxembourg's home ground is at the Pierre Werner Cricket Ground, in Walferdange which belongs to the country's largest club, the Optimists Cricket Club. The ground is named after the late Pierre Werner, a former Prime Minister of Luxembourg (1959–74, 1979–84). Werner had fallen in love with cricket when living in London in 1930, and went on to become the Honorary President of the OCC, which had been established when he was Prime Minister. Werner opened the OCC's new ground in 1992. Widely viewed as one of the best cricket grounds in mainland Europe (excluding grounds in the Netherlands), the ground lies in the picturesque setting just ten minutes from Luxembourg City center. It boasts a large outfield (with two tracks laid on different bases), four practice bays, a clubhouse with catering facilities, a cricket/tennis pavilion and various other amenities.

History
Luxembourg men's international debut came at the 1990 European Cricketer Cup, a European Cricket Council tournament. Outside of occasional matches against Belgium, the team did not return to international level until 2003, when they finished last in the ECC Trophy, an eleven-team tournament for ICC affiliate members. The following year, they took part in the ECC Representative Championship in Slovenia, finishing in fifth place, nearly upsetting Croatia, and completing their first international win, against Bulgaria.

In 2006, Luxembourg took part in Division Four of the European Championship in Belgium, beating Finland, losing narrowly to Slovenia, and losing in the last over against Cyprus. Having narrowly missed out on promotion in 2006, they would play in Division Four again in 2009.

In 2009, Luxembourg again participated in Division Four of the ICC European Championship in Limassol, Cyprus. It won two games, against Slovenia and Finland, and lost three, finishing 4th out of six competing nations. The Luxembourg team won the Spirit of Cricket award.

In 2011, following a restructuring of the ICC European Divisions, Luxembourg participated in the ICC Europe Division 2 (T20) Championship, which took place in Belgium and involved 11 teams. Following a victory over Cyprus in the group stage, Luxembourg advanced to the 5th–8th place play-off where they eventually finished 8th. Belgium beat Austria in the final and both teams were promoted to ICC Europe Division 1.

2018-Present
In April 2018, the ICC decided to grant full Twenty20 International (T20I) status to all its members. Therefore, all Twenty20 matches played between Luxembourg and other ICC members after 1 January 2019 will be a full T20I. Luxembourg played their first T20I match against Turkey on 29 August 2019 during the 2019 Continental Cup in Romania.

Tournament history
2003: ECC Trophy – 11th Place
2004: ECC Representative Tournament – 5th Place
2006: ICC European Division 4 Championship – 3rd place
2009: ICC European Division 4 Championship – 4th place
2011: ICC European Division 2 Championship (T20) – 8th place

Records

International Match Summary — Luxembourg
 
Last updated 31 July 2022.

Twenty20 International 

 Highest team total: 187/4 v. Bulgaria on 2 September 2021 at Moara Vlasiei Cricket Ground, Ilfov County
 Highest individual score: 78, Timothy Barker v. Bulgaria on 2 September 2021 at Moara Vlasiei Cricket Ground, Ilfov County
 Best individual bowling figures: 5/6, Ankush Nanda v. Turkey on 29 August 2019 at Moara Vlasiei Cricket Ground, Moara Vlăsiei

Most T20I runs for Luxembourg

Most T20I wickets for Luxembourg

T20I record versus other nations

Records complete to T20I #1715. Last updated 31 July 2022.

See also
 Cricket in Luxembourg
 Luxembourg Cricket Federation
 List of Luxembourg Twenty20 International cricketers
 Optimists Cricket Club

References

Cricket in Luxembourg
National cricket teams
Cricket
Luxembourg in international cricket